Richard Kenney was the first Church Missionary Society missionary to Bombay, then-headquarters of Bombay Presidency, to evangelize the natives.

References

External links
 The Anglican Church in India, 1600-1970 - p.86
 The Christian Herald and Seaman's Magazine, Volume 9 - p. 789
 Churchman's magazine, Volume 2 - p.224

English Anglican missionaries
Anglican missionaries in India
Missionary educators
Year of birth missing
Year of death missing
Church Mission Society missionaries